Pembatatu is a genus of East African araneomorph spiders in the family Cyatholipidae, and was first described by C. E. Griswold in 2001.  it contains only three species: P. embamba, P. gongo, and P. mafuta.

References

Araneomorphae genera
Cyatholipidae
Spiders of Africa